Blauwepoort Farm is a Commonwealth War Graves Commission burial ground for the dead of the First World War located near Ypres (Dutch: Ieper) in Belgium on the Western Front.

The cemetery grounds were assigned to the United Kingdom in perpetuity by King Albert I of Belgium in recognition of the sacrifices made by the British Empire in the defence and liberation of Belgium during the war.

Foundation
The cemetery was begun in November 1914 by the French Chasseurs Alpins. British burials began in February 1915. The cemetery closed in November 1916,
 with the French graves being removed after the armistice.

The cemetery was designed by W H Cowlishaw.

References

External links
 
 

Commonwealth War Graves Commission cemeteries in Belgium
Cemeteries and memorials in West Flanders